The Boston Storm were a professional soccer team based in Boston, Massachusetts, founded by Dennis Lukens, which competed in the USISL between 1993 and 1995.

References

S
Defunct soccer clubs in Massachusetts
USISL teams
1993 establishments in Massachusetts
1995 disestablishments in Massachusetts
Soccer clubs in Massachusetts
Association football clubs established in 1993
Association football clubs disestablished in 1995